Birgit Schnieber-Jastram (born 4 July 1946 in Hamburg) is a German politician and representative of the Christian Democratic Union of Germany.

Biography 
She attended several schools in Hamburg (1953–1966), worked as a woman editor, and is married with 2 children.

Since 1981, Schnieber-Jastram has been a member of the CDU. From 1986 to 1994 she was a member of the Hamburg Parliament and a member of the Bundestag from 1994 to 2001, including serving as a parliamentary executive of the CDU faction (2000–2001) and in this position a member of the council of elders. From October 2001 to May 2008, she was State Minister for Social and Family Affairs of Hamburg. She was succeeded by Dietrich Wersich. In her position as Senator, she was Second Mayor of Hamburg, from March 2004—after the election of 2004—until May 2008.

In 2009 Schnieber-Jastram was elected to the European Parliament. After her election, Schnieber-Jastram was criticised, among others, by the magazine Der Spiegel, for collecting a pension for her job as Hamburg Senator (€5,500) and receiving monthly €7,665 for her election as MEP. The Hamburg Government announced  plans to change its law, to prevent double income.

References

External links 
Schnieber-Jastram on abgeordnetenwatch.de, retrieved on 2009-07-25

1946 births
Living people
Mayors of Hamburg
Members of the Bundestag for Hamburg
Senators of Hamburg
Christian Democratic Union of Germany MEPs
MEPs for Germany 2009–2014
21st-century women MEPs for Germany
Women ministers of State Governments in Germany
Female members of the Bundestag
Members of the Bundestag for the Christian Democratic Union of Germany
Members of the Bundestag 1998–2002
Members of the Bundestag 1994–1998
20th-century German women